Autobahnkirche Siegerland or Autobahnkirche an der A 45 is an ecumenical Christian road church at the Bundesautobahn 45 near Wilnsdorf, North Rhine-Westphalia, Germany. Opened in 2013, the building has received several architecture awards.

History 
The church is one of several German road churches which was initiated by private patrons and was financed primarily by donations. It was inaugurated on 26 May 2013 and received several architecture awards.

The church is dedicated to quiet contemplation by Christians of all denominations and is always open. It is run by the Förderverein Autobahnkirche Siegerland association. The association organises a Wochenschluss-Andacht on Fridays and occasional cultural events with religious themes, such as sacred music.

Architecture 
The exterior is based on simple geometric elements such as triangles, mostly in white. The silhouette alludes to the pictogram for the German road churches. It resembles a piece of folded paper, with an allusion to two towers. The entrance area features a typographic installation by Peter Zizka, quoting from Psalm 91:11 (Er hat seinen Engeln befohlen dich zu behüten auf allen deinen Wegen - For he shall give his angels charge over thee, to keep thee in all thy ways).

The interior, dominated by wood, contrasts with the abstract exterior. An "organic" wooden structure is reminiscent of a tent. A wooden free-standing structure is focused on the altar, enhanced by indirect lighting.

Awards 
The building was awarded several architecture prizes, including:
 Iconic Awards 2013
  2013
  Award 2014
 Publikumspreis A + Award: "spektakulärstes religiöses Gebäude 2014"

References

External links 

 
 Autobahnkirche Siegerland (in German) architects schneider+schumacher

Road churches
Churches completed in 2013
Churches in North Rhine-Westphalia